Pacllón is a district of the province of Bolognesi, in the Ancash Region of Peru.

The town is within a day's walk from Chiquián. Many of the arrierros (donkey owners) that work in Waywash live here. Donkeys can be obtained here. The town is also home to stores with a regular selection of meals.

The hike from either the lake Hawaqucha  or the Jashapampa valley takes all day and offers some of the best views of the Waywash mountain range. There are places to camp on both sides of the town.

Mountains 
The Waywash range is the natural eastern and southeastern border of the district. The highest peak of the district is Yerupajá which is also the highest elevation of the range at. Other mountains of the district are listed below:

See also 
 Intipa Ñawin

References 

Districts of the Bolognesi Province
Districts of the Ancash Region